Mighty Warriors is an adventure board game created by Games Workshop in 1991 and set in the Warhammer Fantasy fictional universe.  The core rules allowed players to explore dungeons, which were randomly generated, and fight monsters, also randomly generated.  This was a simplified version of Advanced Heroquest.

Synopsis
Below the cities of humanity, underneath the deepest drains and sewers, mutant creatures rule a world of caverns and tunnels. The worst of these creatures are Skaven - Chaos ratmen whose secret tunnel systems connect with the cellars and drains of humanity's proud cities. No-one suspects the extent of the Skaven's crawling evil. They bring plague, fire and death to the prosperous cities of mankind.
In Mighty Warriors a band of heroes, led by a Noble Knight, Fearless Dwarf and Heroic Elf enter a castle that has been overrun by the hideous Ratmen. The Heroes and Skaven must fight a battle for ultimate control of the castle.

Mighty Warriors is a game for two to four players. You can play either the forces of Chaos or a band of Heroic Adventurers as they clash in underground battles. Your task is to defeat your opponent by capturing his command room before he can capture yours!

Game Components
16 Skaven Warriors
4 Skaven Champions
12 Warriors
1 Knight
1 Elf
1 Dwarf
1 Chaos Wizard
1 Heroic shield
1 Chaos Shield
20 Door Stands
28 Black slotta Bases
4 Green Slotta Bases
4 Dice

Card Sheets:
MW1  - Heroic Army List
MW2  - Chaos Army List
MW3  - Chaos Spell Scroll
MW4  - Heroic Spell Scroll
MW5  - Dungeon
MW6  - Guard Room
MW7  - Ancient Temple
MW8  - Barracks
MW9  - Wizards Study
MW10 - Great Hall
MW11 - Doors (7 vertical wood)
MW12 - Doors (7 green vertical wood)
MW13 - Doors (3 diagonal wood, 3 spiked vertical wood)
MW14 - Library
MW15 - Vampires Chamber
MW16 - Treasure Room
MW17 - Alchemists Laboratory
MW18 - Dragon Chamber
MW19 - Skaven Lair

The lid of the gamebox also contained a rules summary and a printed 3x3 grid forming a "combat tray".

See also
 Dungeonquest
 HeroQuest (board game)
 Warhammer Fantasy (setting)
 Warhammer Quest

External links
 

Board games introduced in 1991
Fantasy board games
Warhammer Fantasy
Adventure board games
Miniature wargames
Games Workshop games